The 1967 French Championships (now known as the French Open) was a tennis tournament that took place on the outdoor clay courts at the Stade Roland-Garros in Paris, France. The tournament ran from 22 May until 3 June. It was the 71st staging of the French Championships, and the second Grand Slam tennis event of 1967. It was also the last French Championships before the start of the Open Era in tennis. Roy Emerson and Françoise Dürr won the singles titles.

Finals

Men's singles

 Roy Emerson defeated  Tony Roche 6–1, 6–4, 2–6, 6–2

Women's singles

 Françoise Dürr defeated  Lesley Turner 4–6, 6–3, 6–4

Men's doubles

 John Newcombe /  Tony Roche defeated  Roy Emerson /  Ken Fletcher 6–3, 9–7, 12–10

Women's doubles

 Françoise Dürr /  Gail Sherriff defeated  Annette Van Zyl /  Pat Walkden 6–2, 6–2

Mixed doubles

 Billie Jean King /  Owen Davidson defeated  Ann Haydon Jones /  Ion Ţiriac 6–3, 6–1

References

External links
 French Open official website

French Championships
French Championships (tennis) by year
French Champ
French Championships
French Championships
French Championships